XZ Utils (previously LZMA Utils) is a set of free software command-line lossless data compressors, including the programs lzma and xz, for Unix-like operating systems and, from version 5.0 onwards, Microsoft Windows. For compression/decompression the Lempel–Ziv–Markov chain algorithm (LZMA) is used. XZ Utils started as a Unix port of Igor Pavlov's LZMA-SDK that has been adapted to fit seamlessly into Unix environments and their usual structure and behavior.

Features 

In most cases, xz achieves higher compression rates than alternatives like gzip and bzip2. Decompression speed is higher than bzip2, but lower than gzip. Compression can be much slower than gzip, and is slower than bzip2 for high levels of compression, and is most useful when a compressed file will be used many times.

XZ Utils consists of two major components:

 , the command-line compressor and decompressor (analogous to gzip)
 liblzma, a software library with an API similar to zlib

XZ Utils can compress and decompress both the xz and lzma file formats, but since the LZMA format is now legacy, XZ Utils compresses by default to xz.

Usage 
Both the behavior of the software as well as the properties of the file format have been designed to work similarly to those of the popular Unix compressing tools gzip and bzip2. 

Just like gzip and bzip, xz and lzma can only compress single files (or data streams) as input. They cannot bundle multiple files into a single archive – to do this an archiving program is used first, such as tar.

Compressing an archive:
 xz   my_archive.tar    # results in my_archive.tar.xz
 lzma my_archive.tar    # results in my_archive.tar.lzma

Decompressing the archive:
 unxz    my_archive.tar.xz      # results in my_archive.tar
 unlzma  my_archive.tar.lzma    # results in my_archive.tar

Creating an archive and compressing it:
 tar -c --xz   -f my_archive.tar.xz   /some_directory    # results in my_archive.tar.xz
 tar -c --lzma -f my_archive.tar.lzma /some_directory    # results in my_archive.tar.lzma

Decompressing the archive and extracting its contents:
 tar -x --xz   -f my_archive.tar.xz      # results in /some_directory
 tar -x --lzma -f my_archive.tar.lzma    # results in /some_directory

Single-letter tar example for archive with compress and decompress with extract using short suffix:
 tar cJf keep.txz keep   # archive then compress the directory ./keep/ into the file ./keep.txz
 tar xJf keep.txz        # decompress then extract the file ./keep.txz creating the directory ./keep/

xz has supported multi-threaded compression (with the  flag) since 2014, version 5.2.0.; since version 5.4.0 threaded decompression has been implemented. Threaded decompression requires multiple compressed blocks within a stream which are created by the threaded compression interface. The number of threads can be less than defined if the file is not big enough for threading with the given settings or if using more threads would exceed the memory usage limit.

The xz format 
The xz format improves on lzma by allowing for preprocessing filters. The exact filters used are similar to those used in 7z, as 7z's filters are available in the public domain via the LZMA SDK.

Development and adoption 
Development of XZ Utils took place within the Tukaani Project, which was led by Mike Kezner, by a small group of developers who once maintained a Linux distribution based on Slackware.

All of the source code for xz and liblzma has been released into the public domain.  The XZ Utils source distribution additionally includes some optional scripts and an example program that are subject to various versions of the GPL.

Specifically, the full list of GPL scripts and sources distributed with the XZ Utils software include:

 An optional implementation of a common libc function, getopt (GNU GPL v2 and GNU LGPL v2.1)
 An m4 script for pthread detection (GNU GPL v3)
 Some nonessential wrapper scripts (xzgrep, etc) (GNU GPL v2)
 And the example program scanlzma, which is not integrated with the build system

The resulting software xz and liblzma binaries are public domain, unless the optional LGPL getopt implementation is incorporated.

Binaries are available for FreeBSD, NetBSD, Linux systems, Microsoft Windows, and FreeDOS. A number of Linux distributions, including Fedora, Slackware, Ubuntu, and Debian use xz for compressing their software packages. Arch Linux previously used xz to compress packages, but as of December 27, 2019, packages are compressed with Zstandard compression. The GNU FTP archive also uses xz.

References

External links 
 Official Website
 SourceForge project page

Free data compression software
Free software programmed in C
Public-domain software with source code
Unix archivers and compression-related utilities